Fever is a 1989 Australian thriller film about an Australian policeman who finds a suitcase full of money, and the course of events which unfold when he decides to keep it. The film was directed by Craig Lahiff, and stars Bill Hunter, Gary Sweet, and Mary Regan.

Plot
Sergeant Jack Wells, a tough country cop, discovers a bag of cash after a shoot out. He decides to keep the money so he and his wife Leanne can start a new life. However Leanne has a lover.

Production
The movie was the second of three low budget thrillers Craig Lahiff made in succession. It was made with the assistance of the South Australian Film and Television Financing Fund.

The film was meant to be shot in Port Pirie but the budget did not stretch to location shooting so it was filmed in Port Adelaide.

Release
The film was never released theatrically in Australia but sold widely around the world on video. It made a comfortable profit.

References

External links
 
Fever at Oz Movies

1989 films
Australian independent films
1980s erotic thriller films
Films shot in Adelaide
American erotic thriller films
Australian erotic thriller films
1989 independent films
1990s English-language films
1980s English-language films
1980s American films
1990s American films
1980s Australian films